William Isaac Shelby "Billy" Thompson (November 24, 1936 - November 24, 1993) was a member of the Mississippi House of Representatives for Hinds County, serving from 1964 to 1968.

Biography 
William Isaac Shelby Thompson was born on November 24, 1936, in Jackson, Mississippi. He was the son of Jackson mayor and Mississippi legislator Allen C. Thompson. He graduated from Central High School, the University of Mississippi, and Millsaps College. He was a life insurance salesman. He also was a pilot and flight instructor. In 1964, he was inaugurated to the Mississippi House of Representatives as one of the Hinds County representatives. His term ended in 1968. He died on November 24, 1993, when his single-engine airplane crashed near Bruce Campbell Field in Madison County, Mississippi.

References 

1936 births
1993 deaths
People from Jackson, Mississippi
Members of the Mississippi House of Representatives
Accidental deaths in Mississippi
Aviators killed in aviation accidents or incidents in the United States